Tatiana Dorofeeva may refer to:

 Tatiana Dorofeeva (linguist) (1948–2012), Russian linguist, orientalist and translator
 Tatiana Dorofeeva (equestrian) (born 1965), Russian dressage rider